Franco Brambilla may refer to

 Franco Brambilla (Archbishop) (1923–2003), Vatican diplomat
 Franco Giulio Brambilla (born 1949), Roman Catholic bishop of Novara and theologian
 Franco Brambilla (illustrator) (born 1967), Italian science fiction illustrator
 Franco Brambilla (1922–1942), Italian child actor in The Old Guard (1934)